Nunatarsuaq (old spelling: Nunatarssuaq) is a nunatak in Avannaata municipality in northwestern Greenland.

Geography 
Nunatarsuaq is one of several nunataks in the Upernavik Archipelago, and one of the few named nunataks in Tasiusaq Bay. To the north, it is bounded by Qaaneq fjord, the innermost waterway of Kangerlussuaq Icefjord. To the west, the innermost waterways of Tasiusaq Bay separate it from Aukarnersuaq Island. To the southeast, the Nunatakassaup Sermia glacier drains the Greenland ice sheet into Tasiusaq Bay.

References 

Nunataks of Greenland
Tasiusaq Bay
Upernavik Archipelago